The Bonaventura Heinz House (first) was located in the West End of Davenport, Iowa, United States.  It was listed on the National Register of Historic Places in 1984.  The property was removed from the Register in 2005.  The house was a brick, side-gable structure with a five-bay symmetrical front.  At one time it had a full front porch.  It was typical of Davenport's working-class houses from the decades of the city's early settlement. Heinz moved to the adjoining house, the Bonaventura Heinz House (second).  The family continued to own this property until 1907.  It has subsequently been torn down.

In the West End of Davenport there also exists also a second Bonaventura Heinz House, listed on NHRP from 1983 to 2005.

References

Vernacular architecture in Iowa
Houses in Davenport, Iowa
Houses on the National Register of Historic Places in Iowa
National Register of Historic Places in Davenport, Iowa
Former National Register of Historic Places in Iowa
Working-class culture in Iowa
Demolished buildings and structures in Iowa